Guangzhou Pharmaceuticals Corporation is a pharmaceutical wholesaling and distribution company headquartered in Guangzhou, China, and a 50:50 joint venture between Walgreens Boots Alliance and Guangzhou Pharmaceutical Holdings Limited. It is the third-largest pharmaceutical wholesaler in China measured by revenues.

Guangzhou Pharmaceuticals wholesales prescription drugs, over-the-counter drugs, medical devices, chemical reagents, experiment equipment and glass wares.

History
Guangzhou Pharmaceuticals Corporation was founded in 1951. In January 2007 Alliance Boots agreed to acquire a 50 percent interest in Guangzhou Pharmaceuticals Corporation for £38 million, making it a 50:50 joint venture with Guangzhou Pharmaceutical Co., Ltd.

References

External links
 Guangzhou Pharmaceuticals

Companies based in Guangzhou
Pharmaceutical companies established in 1951
Chinese companies established in 1951
Pharmaceutical companies of China
Chinese brands
Pharmaceutical companies established in 2008
Chinese companies established in 2008
Chinese-foreign joint-venture companies
Walgreens Boots Alliance